"Lost on You" is a song recorded by American recording artist LP (Laura Pergolizzi). It was released on November 20, 2015, as the second single from her third EP, Death Valley and the fourth studio album of the same name (2016). The song experienced commercial success, mostly in Central and Eastern Europe and Western Asia, and topped the charts of thirteen countries. 

The single was certified quadruple Platinum by the Federation of the Italian Music Industry for sales exceeding 200,000 units. In late 2018, "Lost on You" received a release as a single in Mexico to much success. It was among the most-played songs on Contemporary Pop radio in the country, particularly popular in Mexico City.

Background
Being about a failed relationship in her life, LP wrote the song after realizing that her girlfriend was not going to be her partner anymore. "I felt like my lover was drifting away – slowly leaving the building – and there was nothing that I could do," she stated. "It's a breakup song, but it happened almost a year before we broke up, and it was kind of like, 'Hey, do you see what's happening? Is it lost on you that this is going to die?' And then it did." The song was misconstrued, according to LP, although she did not mind it. "People would make it that it was romantic, like, I'm lost on you...Like it's about being lost being in love with you, and that's not really what 'Lost On You' is about. That's the beauty of songs."

Composition
Lasting 4 minutes and 26 seconds, the midtempo song is described as having "a really laid-back vibe, no beats and no rapping...just some strange wailing which sounds like an animal in its death throws, alone somewhere on the bleak tundra, with only the darkness of winter for company." Forbes called the song "an anthem, a juggernaut..." Toronto Star described it as a "post-breakup arena-folk anthem" and The Brag Media described it as a "southern-infused, ukulele-blues, whistling cry from a broken heart". 

The song is written in the key of F minor, with a shuffle rhythm, and has a tempo of 86 beats per minute. LP plays ukulele during the course of the song, in addition to her intermittent whistles.

Reception
Forbes praised the song as being "a cry from a broken heart watching the fading embers of a dying love... It is a break-up song that has resonated with millions of people all over the world...It is resigned and hopeful, fragile and strong; the intimate lyrics and stadium-sized chorus capture the emotional rollercoaster of a heartbreak." Rachael Scarsbrook from Renowned For Sound said the song "is reserved yet nuanced enough to strike a real connection between artist and listener." Michelle Blakey from The Lesbian Review describes 'Lost on You' as "a deeply emotional song chronicling the demise of a relationship...It climbs steadily toward a chorus in which her voice erupts into an injured rage...It is a gut-wrenching song that anyone who has ever felt betrayed by a loved one can relate to."

Success
Although the song was released in November 2015, with the singer already playing the song to various record companies, it did not initially achieve any chart success. In May 2016, however, the song managed to jump to number one in the Greek charts. The song held this top position for 18 weeks, making it the most successful song of the year in Greece. Billboard said the reason for their success was that many vacationers heard their music on the beach and the song was then able to spread across Greece over the summer months. At the end of June 2016, the song also reached the French and Italian charts. In France, the title also reached the top position. In Italy, the song peaked in the top 5 and stayed in the top 10 of the singles chart for over three months. The song was also the fourth most Shazamed song in the world. Regarding its success in Greece, Panagiotis Loulourgas, head of international and A&R manager at the Greek record label Cobalt Music, said it was due to "the feeling of the track, it’s everything. It touches you". In Russia the "Lost on You" Swanky Tunes & Going Deeper Remix was No. 12 on the iTunes sales chart.

After the song became a huge hit in Europe, LP stated "...I was already fuckin' 30 to 40 songs away in my writing. I get these interviews that are very kind and in awe of the whole thing and they'll be, like, 'You must have known it was a huge hit when you wrote it.' And I didn’t know shit. I was on Warner Brothers, they got new people in who didn't like me, who didn't sign me, who didn't care, and they basically said 'Hey, come in and play us your new shit, so we can decide if we want to keep you on the label." LP says that although she still has the scars of the breakup, she is very proud of the song's success.

Music video
In the music video, LP alternates with a red-haired woman. The woman is photo model Laura Hanson Sims. LP knows her privately, but has no close relationship with her. LP often looks yearnful in the music video and drinks to get over the grief, thus representing her own character. At the end of the music video, LP's girlfriend Lauren Ruth Ward can be seen kissing her passionately in the final seconds of the video. Also featured in the video is LP's band member, bassist Brian Stanley.

Charts

Weekly charts

Year-end charts

Certifications

See also
List of Airplay 100 number ones of the 2010s

References

2015 songs
2015 singles
SNEP Top Singles number-one singles
Number-one singles in the Commonwealth of Independent States
Number-one singles in Greece
Number-one singles in Israel
Number-one singles in Poland
Number-one singles in Romania
Songs written by Nate Campany
Songs written by Mike Del Rio
Songs written by LP (singer)
Songs about heartache
Torch songs
LP (singer) songs